United Nations Security Council Resolution 112, adopted on February 6, 1956, after examining the application of the Sudan for membership in the United Nations the Council recommended to the General Assembly that the Sudan be admitted.

The resolution was passed unanimously.

See also
List of United Nations Security Council Resolutions 101 to 200 (1953–1965)

References
Text of the Resolution at undocs.org

External links
 

 0112
History of Sudan
1956 in Sudan
 0112
 0112
February 1956 events